Durrës is a city in west-central Albania on the Adriatic Sea within the Mediterranean Sea.

Durrës may also refer to:

 Durrës County, an administrative county surrounding Durrës
 Durrës District, a former administrative district surrounding Durrës
 Durrës County (Kingdom of Serbia), a former county of the Kingdom of Serbia

See also 
 Durazzo family